The Johnson South Reef Skirmish was an altercation that took place on 14 March 1988 between Chinese and Vietnamese forces over who would control the Johnson South Reef in the Union Banks region of the Spratly Islands in the South China Sea.

Background
The 14th UNESCO Intergovernmental Oceanographic Commission (IOC) agreed that China would establish five observation posts for worldwide ocean survey, including one in the Spratly Islands, and they commissioned China to build an observation post there in March 1987. The Delegate of the People's Republic of China (PRC) spoke highly of GLOSS (Global Sea Level Observing System) during the meeting of the UNESCO IOC in Paris, but he noted what the PRC considered to be a few mistakes in the text of Document IOC/INF-663; for example, "Taiwan" is listed as a "country" in relevant tables contained in the document.
The scientists from the GLOSS did not know that the PRC claims that Taiwan is not a separate country; nor did they know about the territorial disputes in the South China Sea. They agreed that China would install tide gauges on its coasts in the East China Sea, and on what the PRC calls its Nansha Islands in the South China Sea. The scientists did not know that Taiwan occupied one of the Spratly Islands, but (despite its territorial claims), at that time China occupied none. After numerous surveys and patrols, in April 1987 China chose Fiery Cross Reef as the ideal (from their point of view) location for the observation post, because the unoccupied reef was remote from other settlements, and it was large enough for the observation post. On the other hand, Johnson South Reef in the Union Banks sunken atoll, (150 km east of Fiery Cross Reef), is close to the Vietnamese inhabited Sin Cowe Island (also in the Union Banks), and it is also within the Philippine claimed 200 nautical mile Economic Exclusion Zone; in other words, Johnson South Reef is in a high profile and highly disputed area.
In January and February 1988, Vietnamese forces began establishing a presence at surrounding reefs, including Collins Reef and Lansdowne Reef in the Union Banks, in order to monitor Chinese activity. This led to a series of confrontations.

Course

China's account
On 13 March, the frigate Nanchong detected People's Army of Vietnam (PAVN) armed naval transport HQ-604 heading toward Johnson South Reef, transport HQ-605 heading toward Lansdowne Reef, and landing craft HQ-505 heading toward Collins Reef in a simultaneous three-pronged intrusion upon the disputed reefs.

At approximately 07:30 on Johnson South Reef, Vietnamese troops attempted to erect the Vietnamese flag on the reef. It was reported that PAVN Corporal Nguyen Van Lanh and PAVN Sub Lieutenant Tran Van Phuong argued over the flag raising with People's Liberation Army Navy (PLAN) sailor Du Xianghou, which led to a pitched battle between the opposing forces on the reef. In response, Vietnamese forces, with naval transport HQ-604 in support, opened fire. PLAN forces and the frigate Nanchong counter-attacked at 08:47 hours. Transport HQ-604 was set ablaze and sunk.

At 09:15 hours, the frigate Xiangtan arrived at Lansdowne Reef and found that nine Vietnamese marines from transport HQ-605 had already landed. The frigate Xiangtan immediately hailed the Vietnamese and demanded they withdraw from the reef. Instead, the Vietnamese opened fire. HQ-605 was damaged heavily and finally sunk by the Chinese.

Vietnam's account
In January 1988, China sent a group of ships from Hainan to the southern part of the South China Sea. This included four ships, including three frigates, dispatched to the north-west of the Spratly Islands. The four ships then began provoking and harassing the Vietnamese ships around Tizard Bank and the London Reefs. Vietnam believed this battle group intended to create a reason to "occupy the Spratly Islands in a preventive counterstrike".

In response, two transport ships from the Vietnamese Navy's 125th Naval Transport Brigade, HQ-604 and HQ-505, were mobilized. They carried nearly 100 army officers and men to Johnson South Reef (Đá Gạc Ma), Collins Reef (Đá Cô Lin), and Lansdowne Reef (Đá Len Đao) in the Spratly Islands. On 14 March 1988, as the soldiers from HQ-604 were moving construction materials to Johnson South Reef, the four Chinese ships arrived. The three Chinese frigates approached the reef:
 Nanchong (502) (Jiangnan class / Type 065). Displaces 1,400 tons, equipped with three 100 mm guns and eight 37 mm AA guns.
 Xiangtan (556) (Jianghu-II class / Type 053H1). Displaces 1,925 tons, equipped with four 100 mm guns and two 37 mm AA guns.
 Yingtan (531) (Jiangdong class / Type 053K). Displaces 1,925 tons, equipped with four 100 mm guns and eight 37 mm AA guns.
Commander Tran Duc Thong ordered Second Lieutenant Tran Van Phuong and two men, Nguyen Van Tu and Nguyen Van Lanh, to rush to the reef in a small boat and protect the Vietnamese flag that had been planted there the previous day. The Chinese landed armed soldiers on the reef, and the PLAN frigates opened fire on the Vietnamese ships. Both the HQ-604 and HQ-605 transport ships were sunk. The HQ-505 transport ship was ordered to run aground on Collins reef to prevent the Chinese from taking it.

Vietnamese soldiers, most of them unarmed, formed a circle on the reef to protect the Vietnamese flag. The Chinese attacked, and the Vietnamese soldiers resisted as best they could. A skirmish ensued in which the Chinese shot and bayoneted some Vietnamese soldiers to death, but the Chinese were unable to capture the flag. The Chinese finally retreated enabling PLAN frigates to open fire on the reef's defenders. When all of the Vietnamese had been killed or wounded, the Chinese occupied the reef and began building a bunker. 64 Vietnamese soldiers had been killed in the battle according to Vietnamese reports.
Vietnam also accused China of refusing to allow Vietnam's Red Cross ship to recover bodies and rescue wounded soldiers.

Independent account
Cheng Tun-jen and Tien Hung-mao, two American professors, summarized the skirmish as follows: in late 1987, the PRC started deploying troops to some of the unoccupied reefs of the Spratly Islands. Soon after the PLA stormed the Johnson South Reef on 14 March 1988, a skirmish began between Vietnamese troops and PRC landing parties. Within a year, the PLA occupied and took over seven reefs and rocks in the Spratly Islands.

Koo Min Gyo, Assistant Professor in the Department of Public Administration at Yonsei University, Seoul, South Korea, reported the battle's course was as follows: On 31 January 1988, two Vietnamese armed cargo ships approached the Fiery Cross Reef to get construction material to build structures signifying Vietnam's claim over the reef. However, the PLAN intercepted the ships and forced them away from the reef. On 17 February, a group of Chinese ships (a PLAN destroyer, escort, and transport ships) and several Vietnamese ships (a minesweeper and armed freighter) all attempted to land troops at Cuarteron Reef. Eventually the outgunned Vietnamese ships were forced to withdraw. On 13 and 14 March, a PLAN artillery frigate was surveying the Johnson Reef when it spotted three Vietnamese ships approaching its location. Both sides dispatched troops to occupy Johnson Reef. After shots were fired by ground forces on the reef, the Chinese and Vietnamese ships opened fire on each other.

Aftermath
China moved quickly to consolidate its presence. By the end of 1988, it had occupied six reefs and atolls in the Spratly Islands.

On 2 September 1991, China released the nine Vietnamese prisoners taken during the Johnson South Reef Skirmish.

In 1994, China had a similar confrontation by asserting its ownership of Mischief Reef, which was inside the claimed EEZ of the Philippines. However, the Philippines only made a political protest, since according to the Henry L. Stimson Center, the Philippine Navy decided to avoid direct confrontation. This was partly based on the Johnson South Reef Skirmish, in which the Chinese had killed Vietnamese troops even though the conflict took place near the Vietnamese-controlled area.

See also
 Spratly Islands dispute
 Battle of the Paracel Islands
 Naval history of China

References

Bibliography
 The South China Sea Online Resource
 Kelly, Todd C. (1999). "Vietnamese Claims to the Truong Sa Archipelago". Explorations in Southeast Asian Studies Vol 3

Indochina Wars
Conflicts in 1988
1988 in China
1988 in Vietnam
Military history of Vietnam
Military history of the People's Republic of China
Naval battles involving Vietnam
Naval battles involving China
History of the Spratly Islands
History of the South China Sea
China–Vietnam military relations
March 1988 events in Asia
Third Indochina War
Naval battles post-1945
People's Liberation Army Navy
China–Vietnam relations